Kokkinotrimithia ( []) is a village located west of Nicosia, Cyprus, close to the Green Line. It has an exit along the A9 motorway. In 2011, it had 4,077 inhabitants.

References

Communities in Nicosia District